Maceration, in sewage treatment, is the use of a machine that reduces solids to small pieces in order to deal with rags and other solid waste.  Macerating toilets use a grinding or blending mechanism to reduce human waste to a slurry, which can then be moved by pumping.  This is useful when, for example, water pressure is low or one wishes to install a toilet below the sewer drain pipe.

Maceration can be achieved by using a chopper pump in the sewage lift station or at the wastewater treatment plant.

In Antarctica
At Antarctic research stations with an average summer population of more than 30 people, maceration is the minimum treatment level required before sewage can be disposed of in the sea. This procedure is outlined in the Madrid Protocol, an international treaty outlining environmental practices to be followed in Antarctica. Research stations that do not meet this population threshold are allowed to dump untreated, unmacerated sewage directly into the sea. The treaty also allows ships carrying more than ten people to discharge macerated wastewater (including sewage and food waste) directly into the sea, provided that the vessel is more than 12 nautical miles from shore.

Other large-scale macerative processes
In food processing plants, maceration refers to the use of a chopper pump to create a "blended" slurry of food waste and other organic byproducts. The macerated substance, which can be described as a protein-rich slurry, is often used for animal feed, fertilizer, and for co-digestion feedstock in biogas plants.

References

External links 
macerator.org - Reasons to Consider Buying a Macerator Pump (read 2013-02-15)
Saniflo Macerator Pumps
Saniflo

Sewerage